Imelda Gruber (born 11 August 1986) is an Italian luger who has competed since the mid-2000s. A natural track luger, she won the silver medal in the women's singles event at the 2006 FIL European Luge Natural Track Championships in Umhausen, Austria.

References
FIL-Luge profile

External links 
 

1986 births
Living people
Italian female lugers
Italian lugers
People from Mals
Sportspeople from Südtirol